Daniel Antosch (born 7 March 2000) is an Austrian footballer who plays as a goalkeeper for Cypriot First Division club Pafos.

Career
Antosch started his career with Liefering.

Career statistics

References

2000 births
Living people
Austrian footballers
Austria youth international footballers
Association football goalkeepers
FC Liefering players
Pafos FC players
2. Liga (Austria) players
Cypriot First Division players
Austrian expatriate footballers
Expatriate footballers in Cyprus
Austrian expatriate sportspeople in Cyprus